Terminus is a 1986 French-German science fiction film directed by Pierre-William Glenn.

Plot
In the year 2037, an international sport has been established, wherein a driver of a truck must cross the country and arrive at a designated terminus, while confronting obstacles and enemies along the way.  The lead truck, named "Monster", has been designed by a boy genius (Gabriel Damon) and is to be piloted through the course by a woman named Gus (Karen Allen).  Eventually, the truck's AI fails and Gus ends up in uncharted territories.  There, she encounters leather-clad "hoods" (hoodlums) that torture her and eventually kill her.  Prior to dying, she befriends a fellow prisoner (Johnny Hallyday), who later uses the truck to rescue himself and a young orphan.  Meanwhile, the boy genius watches them by an artificial satellite so that he may see how well the truck's software works.  The conclusion reveals that as he watches the truck, he is himself watched and evaluated by the sinister doctor (Jürgen Prochnow) who cloned him.

Cast
Johnny Hallyday as Stump (Manchot)
Karen Allen as Gus 
Jürgen Prochnow as Doctor/Sir/the hostile truck driver
Gabriel Damon as Mati
Dominique Valera as The commander

Reception
This film has been categorized as a strange oddity with Moria giving it two of four stars. The props and sets were praised. This French-German production is one of the strangest oddities to emerge from the cycle of films inspired by Mad Max 2.

Soundtrack

Released as a vinyl album in France by Carrere

A1 	End Of The Line (Long Version) Vocals – Stan Ridgway 05:40

A2 	Tracks 	1:50

A3 	The Grey's Pursuit 	2:17

A4 	Higway Chase 	3:12

A5 	Docteur Labo 	1:42

A6 	Monster's Drive 	2:06

A7 	Military Roadblock 	2:05

B1 	Love Theme "Terminus" Composed By – Stan Ridgway Performer – Stan Ridgway 4:30

B2 	Princess Tango 	2:42

B3 	Bridge In Fire 	1:15

B4 	Jailbird 	2:15

B5 	Terminus (Front Title) 	3:36

B6 	Higway Chase 	3:12

All compositions by David Cunningham except A1 and B1 by Stan Ridgway

References

External links
 
 
 
 
 Terminus at unifrance.org

1987 films
West German films
Films set in the future
French science fiction action films
French road movies
1980s science fiction action films
Dystopian films
Cyberpunk films
German road movies
1980s road movies
1980s French-language films
English-language French films
English-language German films
1980s French films
1980s German films